Canalispira attentia is a species of sea snail, a marine gastropod mollusk, in the family Cystiscidae.

References

attentia
Gastropods described in 1957